Gustav Hjalmarsson (born April 2, 1986) is a Swedish professional ice hockey player. He is currently playing with Växjö Lakers Hockey in the Swedish Elitserien.

References

External links

1986 births
Swedish ice hockey forwards
Living people
Växjö Lakers players